Banca IMI is a subsidiary of Intesa Sanpaolo which is specialized in investment banking and capital markets. The bank can trace its origins to the Istituto Mobiliare Italiano. IMI merged with Istituto Bancario San Paolo di Torino to form Sanpaolo IMI in 1998 (through which a new subsidiary of the new group Banca d'Intermediazione Mobiliare was created ), which in turn merged with Banca Intesa in January 2007. In October Banca IMI (as Banca d'Intermediazione Mobiliare IMI S.p.A.) absorbed the corresponding subsidiary of Intesa: Banca Caboto to become the new Banca IMI S.p.A..

References

External links

 

Banks of Italy
Intesa Sanpaolo subsidiaries
Sanpaolo IMI
Banks established in 1931
Italian companies established in 1931
Companies formerly listed on the Borsa Italiana
Companies based in Milan
Formerly government-owned companies of Italy